Adolphe is a French novel by Benjamin Constant, published in 1816.

Adolphe may also refer to:

Adolphe (given name), an alternative spelling of the given name Adolf
Adolphe, Grand Duke of Luxembourg (1817–1905), monarch of Luxembourg
Adolphe (film), a 2002 film based on the novel
Adolphe (ship), a ship wrecked near the mouth of the Hunter River in New South Wales, Australia in 1904
Operation Adolphe, a French military operation of the First Indochina War

People with the surname
Bruce Adolphe (born 1955), American composer and music scholar
Monique Adolphe (born 1932), French scientist

See also
St. Adolphe, Manitoba, a community in Manitoba, Canada